The Asociación de Scouts de Guatemala is the national Scouting organization of Guatemala. Scouting was founded in Guatemala in September 24, 1920 and became a member of the World Organization of the Scout Movement in 1930. The association had xxxxxx members as of 2011.

The Scout Association is open to all young people, both boys and girls. Its aim is to promote positive cultural and civic activities and moral standards through out-of-school educational programs.

Program and ideals

The Scout Motto is Siempre listo para servir, Always prepared to serve.

The Scout emblem of the Asociación de Scouts de Guatemala incorporates the quetzal of the coat of arms perched on a shield of the flag of Guatemala.

Scout Promise

"Yo por mi honor prometo, hacer cuanto de mi dependa para cumplir mis deberes para con Dios y la patria, ayudar al prójimo en toda circunstancia y cumplir fielmente la Ley Scout."

Scout Law
El Scout cifra su honor en ser digno de confianza
El Scout es leal para con su patria, padres, jefes y subordinados
El Scout es util y ayuda a los demas sin pensar en recompensa
El Scout es amigo de todos y hermano de todo Scout sin distincion de credo, raza, nacionalidad o clase social
El Scout es cortez y actua con nobleza
El Scout ve en la naturaleza la obra de Dios, protégé a los animales y plantas
El Scout sonrie y canta en sus dificultades
El Scout es economico, trabajador y cuidadoso del bien ajeno
El Scout es limpio, sano y puro de pensamiento, palabras y acciones

Awards and recognition
In 1974, Professor Armando Gálvez was awarded the Bronze Wolf, the only distinction of the World Organization of the Scout Movement, awarded by the World Scout Committee for exceptional services to world Scouting.

Other recipients include Julio Montes Taracena in 1977. He served as a member of the World Scout Committee of Geneva, Switzerland from 1979 to 1985. He was a recipient of the Silver World Award in 1972. He took part in 11 World Conferences in many countries, and attended 14 Interamerican Scout Conferences.

See also
 Asociación Nacional de Muchachas Guías de Guatemala

References

External links
 Independent Scouts

World Organization of the Scout Movement member organizations
Scouting and Guiding in Guatemala
Youth organizations established in 1920